Hwadae County is a county in southern North Hamgyong province, North Korea, with an area of about 460 km2 and a population of approximately 70,000.  It adjoins the Sea of Japan (East Sea of Korea) on the east and south.  By land, it adjoins Kimchaek and Kilchu to the west, and Myŏngch'ŏn to the north.  The county was formed from parts of Kilchu and Myŏngch'ŏn in the 1950s, as part of a general reorganization of local government.  Administratively, Hwadae is divided into one ŭp and 20 ri.

The southern region is relatively flat, while the inland north is rugged, with mountains of approximately 1,000 meters.  The Musudan-ri missile base is located on the coast near its namesake cape, which forms the northern end of the East Korea Bay.

In April 2002, Paleolithic fossils of approximately 300,000 years age were reported to have been excavated from a lava bed in Hwadae.  Goguryeo-period tombs have also been unearthed in the county.

The country's first satellite launch facility, Tonghae Satellite Launching Ground, is located in the county.

Administrative divisions
Hwadae County is divided into 1 ŭp (town) and 20 ri (villages):

See also
Administrative divisions of North Korea
Geography of North Korea

References

External links

Counties of North Hamgyong